Negril is a small (pop. 6,900) but widely dispersed beach resort and town located in Westmoreland and Westmoreland ONLY. However the Negril Beach extends from the town across the Border of Hanover.

Westmoreland is the westernmost parish in Jamaica, located on the south side of the island. Downtown Negril, the West End cliff resorts to the south of downtown, and the southern portion of the so-called seven mile (11 km) beach are in Westmoreland Parish. The northernmost resorts are along the Negril Beach and are nearer if not across the border where Westmoreland Parish meets the Hanover Parish. The nearest large town is Savanna-la-Mar, the capital of Westmoreland Parish if traveling South West. Whereas going in the opposite direction along the A1 highway is Lucea, the Capital Town of Hanover.

History

Spanish colonialism
The name Negril is a shortened version of Negrillo (Spanish: Little black one), as it was originally named by the Spaniards in 1494. A theory holds that because there was a vast population of black eels along Negril's coast, the Spaniards called the area Anguila Negra, which was shortened to Negrillo and then to Negril.

20th century
Negril's development as a resort location began during the late 1950s, though access to the area proved difficult as ferries were required to drop off passengers in Negril Bay, forcing them to wade to shore.  Most vacationers would rent rooms inside the homes of Jamaican families, or would pitch tents in their yards. Daniel Connell was the first person to create more conventional vacation lodging for these "flower children" when he set up the first guest house in Negril - Palm Grove. The area's welcoming and hospitable reputation grew over time and the first of many resorts was constructed in the mid to late 1960s. The first hotel in Negril was the Yacht Club by Mary's Bay on the West End.

When the road between Montego Bay and Negril was improved in the early 1970s, it helped to increase Negril's status as a new resort location. The long paved road from the village ran north to Green Island, home to many of the Jamaican workers in Negril, and was straight enough to double as a runway for small airplanes. Lengths of railroad track stand on end along the side of the road to discourage drug smugglers from landing on the road to pick up cheap cargos of marijuana.

After Negril's infrastructure was expanded—anticipating the growth of resorts and an expanding population, a small airport, the Negril Aerodrome, was built in 1976 near Rutland Point, alongside several small hotels mostly catering to the North American winter tourists. Europeans also came to Negril, and several hotels were built to cater directly to those guests.

For years, Negril's beach was rated as one of the top ten beaches in the world by several travel magazines. The beach's length is significant — the two bays (Bloody Bay to the north, and Long Bay to the south) comprise the Seven Mile Beach. The beach is actually roughly 7 miles in length, with Bloody Bay being around 2 miles, and Long Bay being just under 5 miles. Bloody Bay is home to the large, all-inclusive resorts, and Long Bay has all-inclusives and smaller, family-run hotels.

South of downtown Negril is West End Road, known as the West End, which is lined with resorts that offer more privacy.

Many vendors and shops are located around the beach resorts; however, they are predominantly located on the south end of the beach, where there are fewer all-inclusive resorts.

A new highway from Montego Bay and an improved infrastructure may bring more tourists. As a result, more hotels and tour operators continue to develop new attractions and excursions in Negril. Since the 1980s, it has also become a popular location for U.S. college students to visit during spring break, or just a regular vacation in Jamaica.

The last few years have seen major development along the beach. The resorts include Couples Swept Away, Couples Negril, Sandals, Beaches, Samsara Hotel, Legends Resort, the Grand Lido, Riu Palace Tropical Bay, Riu Club Hotel, and Hedonism II. The Hedonism II resort is one enduring hotel and resort that remains an adult destination. 

A franchise of Jimmy Buffett's chain restaurant and bar, Jimmy Buffett's Margaritaville, and a duty-free zone have also been added. Currently under construction is the huge new Royalton Negril Resort.

In recent years, a large development has been constructed consisting of ocean front villas, 2 or 3 bed townhouse developments and studio apartments. This development is known as Little Bay Country Club and is home to some of the wealthiest Jamaican families.

The Reggae Marathon has been held yearly in Negril since 2001.

Geography and ecology
The geography of Jamaica is diverse. The western coastline contains the island's finest beaches, stretching for more than  along a sandbar at Negril.

On the inland side of Negril's main road, to the east of the shore, lies a swamp called the Great Morass, through which runs the Negril River. Within the Great Morass is the Royal Palm Reserve, with protected wetlands and forest.

In 1990, the Negril Coral Reef Preservation Society was formed as a non-profit, non-governmental organization to address ongoing degradation of the coral reef ecosystem.

Scuba diving and snorkeling are especially good in the protected reef areas.

The West End Road is also known as Lighthouse Road as there is a Belgian engineered lighthouse protecting seafarers from the cliffs.  There are views from this western tip of Negril, near Negril Lighthouse.

Popular culture and media references
Negril is featured in Ian Fleming's 1965 novel The Man with the Golden Gun. One of the schemes of the novel's antagonist Francisco Scaramanga was to open a hotel called "Thunderbird" on a Negril beach.

Negril is mentioned in the lyrics of the 1976 Bob Seger song "Sunspot Baby", which is the first song on the second side of the album Night Moves.

Negril is mentioned in lyrics of the 1996 Jimmy Buffett's song "Jamaica Mistaica", which is the second song on the album Banana Wind. 

Negril is mentioned in the 2008 Mad Men episode "The Jet Set"' (Season Two, Episode 11), which appeared on AMC.

Resorts
 Beaches Resorts - Negril
 Couples Negril
 Couples Swept Away
 Grand Lido
 GreenLeaf Cabins Resort
 Hedonism II
 Little Bay Country Club (LBCC)
 Royalton Negril
 Sandals Negril

Notable people
Owen Beck, Jamaican heavyweight boxer
B. Denham Jolly, Jamaican-Canadian businessman and human rights activist
Joel Augustus Rogers, Jamaican author and Africa historian

See also
 List of beaches in Jamaica

Notes

References

 Banana Shout,  (Fiction), by Mark Conklin, Fusion Press; 1st edition (March 2000).  
 How Stella Got Her Groove Back, (Fiction), by Terry McMillan, Viking (1996).  
 The Naked Truth About Hedonism II, (Nonfiction), by Chris Santilli (last updated in paper July 2006). 
 The Republic of Pirates, (Nonfiction), by Colin Woodward (2007).

External links

 Aerial view
 Negril Information
 Negril Notes
 Negril Information @ Negril Travel Guide.com

Beaches of Jamaica
Populated coastal places in Jamaica
Populated places in Westmoreland Parish
Populated places in Hanover Parish